The  is a research institute founded in 1975 to carry out research on historical Dutch-Japanese relations and to foster and promote modern academic and cultural exchange. In 1986, they received the Japan Foundation's special prize for contributions to cultural exchange and mutual understanding between Japan and other countries.

Work 
Intercultural-academic exchange
In 1986, the Japan-Netherlands Institute began a program to enable Dutch students and researchers to carry out an integral part of their research in Japan. Starting in 1994 the Dutch Ministry of Education, Culture and Science began supporting the institute eventually leading to its Japan Prizewinners Program(JPP) from 1995–2008 wherein Dutch students were selected to study Modern Japan for a year before being sent to Japan to study and carry out their research plans. 210 students ultimately passed through the JPP before its conclusion in 2008. Study abroad programs are still supported by the institute however.

In addition to their exchange programs, the Japan-Netherlands Institute holds symposiums on a wide range of topics, organizes lectures at their site or at Japanese universities by prominent Dutch scientists, publishes notices of the findings of young Japanese and Dutch scholars, and offers aide and assistance to Japanese and Dutch scholars within either country.

Research
Research on Dutch-Japanese studies is both supported and carried out by the institute, and forms the basis for a majority of their publications.

References

External links 
Japan-Netherlands Institute Publications
History institutes
Linguistic research institutes
Research institutes in Japan
Research institutes of international relations
Japan–Netherlands relations